Julian is an unincorporated community in southern Guilford County, North Carolina, United States. It lies along North Carolina Highway 62, just east of U.S. Route 421.

Notable person

Artist MC Coble is from Julian.

References

Unincorporated communities in Guilford County, North Carolina
Unincorporated communities in North Carolina